Matthew Keeslar (born October 15, 1972) is an American retired actor and practicing PA-C (certified physician assistant). He is an instructor of urology at the Oregon Health & Science University's School of Medicine.

Life and career
Matthew Keeslar was born in Grand Rapids, Michigan, the son of Fred Keeslar and Ann Ferguson, who divorced in 1977.

He attended the acting program at the Juilliard School. While a student there, he played the title role in a touring production of Molière's Don Juan, directed by Joseph Chaiken; produced and starred in a student production of Waiting for Godot; and participated in several interdepartmental productions. He was part of the Drama Division's Group 24, graduating in 1995.

Keeslar is known for his roles in Waiting for Guffman, The Last Days of Disco and Scream 3, and the miniseries Frank Herbert's Dune and Stephen King's Rose Red. He starred in the 2008 ABC Family series The Middleman. He established a strong working relationship with South Coast Repertory in Costa Mesa, California, where he performed plays and staged readings.

Keeslar went on to pursue a career in science. He wrote an essay about his struggles with his acting career and subsequent decision to enroll at Portland Community College. He graduated Phi Beta Kappa from Reed College with a biology degree in May 2014. His biology thesis explored the effects of antimalarials on the brains of frogs.

Keeslar is married to Grammy-nominated singer Lori Henriques, with whom he has two children.

Filmography
Sources:

References

External links

 Matthew Keeslar, PA-C, Instructor of Urology, School of Medicine, Oregon Health & Science University
Faculty profile
Health care profile
 

1972 births
American male film actors
American male television actors
Living people
Male actors from Grand Rapids, Michigan
Juilliard School alumni
Male nurses
American nurses
Portland Community College alumni
Reed College alumni